The Stockholm Concert is a live album by saxophonist Stan Getz which was recorded in Sweden in 1983 and released on the Swedish Sonet label in 1989.

Reception

The Allmusic review said "If anything, Getz's tone became even more luscious through the years yet he never seemed to lose his fire".

Track listing
 "How Long Has This Been Going On?" (George Gershwin, Ira Gershwin) - 5:55 	
 "I'll Remember April" (Gene de Paul, Patricia Johnston, Don Raye) - 11:09
 "Blood Count" (Billy Strayhorn) - 5:04
 "O Grande Amor" (Antônio Carlos Jobim, Vinícius de Moraes) - 6:36
 "We'll Be Together Again" (Carl T. Fischer, Frankie Laine) - 7:29
 "The Baggage Room Blues" (Alec Wilder, Arnold Sundgaard) - 8:27

Personnel 
Stan Getz - tenor saxophone
Jim McNeely - piano 
George Mraz - bass 
Victor Lewis - drums

References 

1989 live albums
Stan Getz live albums
Sonet Records live albums